Brenton Howell Johnson (born May 16, 1963) is a former American football center who played one season with the Chicago Bears of the National Football League. He played college football at the University of Tennessee at Chattanooga and attended Red Bank High School in Red Bank, Tennessee. He was also a member of the Chicago Bruisers of the Arena Football League.

References

External links
Just Sports Stats

Living people
1963 births
Players of American football from Tennessee
American football centers
Chattanooga Mocs football players
Chicago Bruisers players
Chicago Bears players
Sportspeople from Chattanooga, Tennessee